Casey Walters (June 25, 1916 – December 3, 1991) was an American film, television and theatre actor. He was known for playing the role of Sgt. Jim Warren in the American police procedural television series Harbor Command.

Born in Boston, Massachusetts. Walters began his career in 1948, as appearing in the Broadway play Mister Roberts, where he played the role of “Dolan”.

Later in his career, Walters appeared in another Broadway play, titled, Red Roses for Me,
playing the role of “Mulcany”. His final Broadway credit was from the play A Minor Adjustment, in which he played the role of “Cameron Clark”. In his film and television career, Walters co-starred in the police procedural television series Harbor Command playing the role of “Sgt. Jim Warren”, in which Walters starred with Wendell Corey who played the role of “Captain Ralph Baxter”.

Walters died in December 1991 of a stroke in Helena, Montana, at the age of 75.

References

External links 

Rotten Tomatoes profile

1916 births
1991 deaths
People from Boston
Male actors from Boston
American male film actors
American male television actors
American male stage actors
20th-century American male actors